Angus is a county constituency of the House of Commons of the Parliament of the United Kingdom (at Westminster). It elects one Member of Parliament (MP) by the first-past-the-post voting system. It is currently represented by Dave Doogan of the Scottish National Party who has been the MP since 2019.

It was created for the 1997 general election, largely replacing East Angus. As a result of boundary changes for the 2005 general election, the boundaries became quite different from those of the Angus Scottish Parliament constituency, which was created in 1999 and abolished in 2011.

The constituency is dominated by farmland, and includes the towns of Arbroath, Montrose, Brechin and Forfar.

Boundaries 

1997–2005: The Angus District electoral divisions of Arbroath Central, Arbroath East, Arbroath North and Central Angus, Carnoustie East and Arbroath West, Carnoustie West, Montrose North, and Montrose South, and the City of Dundee District electoral divisions of Monifieth and Sidlaw.

2005–present: The Angus Council wards of Arbirlot and Hospitalfield, Arbroath North, Brechin North Esk, Brechin South Esk, Brechin West, Brothock, Cliffburn, Forfar Central, Forfar East, Forfar South, Forfar West, Harbour, Hayshead and Lunan, Keptie, Kirriemuir East, Kirriemuir West, Letham and Friockheim, Montrose Central, Montrose Ferryden, Montrose Hillside, Montrose West, and Westfield and Dean.

The constituency covers the Angus council area, minus an area round the Dundee City council area, which is divided between the Dundee East and Dundee West constituencies.

Major towns in the House of Commons constituency are Arbroath, Brechin, Forfar, Kirriemuir and Montrose.

Members of Parliament

Election results

Elections in the 2010s

Elections in the 2000s

Elections in the 1990s

References

Westminster Parliamentary constituencies in Scotland
Constituencies of the Parliament of the United Kingdom established in 1997